Calytrix verruculosa is a species of plant in the myrtle family Myrtaceae that is endemic to Western Australia.

It usually blooms between August and October producing pink-white star-shaped flowers.

Found in the Mid West region of Western Australia between Meekatharra and Cue where it grows on sandy clay soils.
 
The species was first formally described by the botanist Lyndley Craven in 1987 in the article A taxonomic revision of Calytrix Labill. (Myrtaceae) in the journal Brunonia.

References

Plants described in 1987
verruculosa
Flora of Western Australia